Vadim Viktorovich Repin (born 31 August 1971) is a Russian and Belgian violinist who lives in Vienna.

After hearing one of Repin's performances, violinist Yehudi Menuhin said: "Vadim Repin is simply the best and most perfect violinist that I have ever had the chance to hear."

Education
Vadim Repin was born in Novosibirsk, Western Siberia, on 31 August 1971. In 1985 at fourteen he made his débuts in Tokyo, München, Berlin, Helsinki; a year later in Carnegie Hall.

Professional career
At the age of 17, he became the youngest winner of violin section of the Queen Elisabeth Music Competition in Brussels, the world's premier violin competition . He was a member of the jury in the 2009 violin section of this competition. Vadim Repin has played under such leading conductors as Simon Rattle, Valery Gergiev, Mariss Jansons, and Yehudi Menuhin. 

Vadim Repin has been a frequent guest at festivals such as the BBC Proms, Tanglewood, Gstaad and Verbier. In 2010 he played the premiere of James MacMillan Violin Concerto with the London Symphony Orchestra under Gergiev which was dedicated to him.

Repertoire and recordings
Repin specializes in Russian music and French music, particularly the great Russian violin concertos, as well as 20th-century and contemporary music.

Instruments
1982-1984 a unique Stradivari three-quarter size on loan from the Russian State Collection
1984–1989 Stradivari 1720 "ex-Wieniawski-Wieniawski" on loan from the Russian State Collection
1996 Repin played shortly the Guarneri del Gesù 1737 "Isaac Stern ex-Panette-Panette," a loan by David Fulton
1996–2005 Stradivari 1708 "Ruby", as a loan by the Stradivari Society in Chicago and previously played by Pablo de Sarasate
2005 Guarneri del Gesù 1742 "Il Cannone ex Paganini" as a loan by the Municipal Administration of Genua for the use in a concert in the city
2002-2009 Guarneri del Gesù 1736 "Von Szerdahely"
2010-2013 Guarneri del Gesù 1743 "Bonjour"
2013-2015 Guarneri del Gesù 1736 "Lafont"
Since 2015 Vadim Repin plays a Stradivari 1733 "Rode" 
His preferred bows are by Nicolaus Kittel and Nicolas Maline.

Personal life
Vadim Repin married Caroline Diemunsch in 2001. Their son Leonardo was born in 2006.

His current wife is Svetlana Zakharova, the principal dancer of the Bolshoi Ballet. They have a daughter, who was born in February 2011.

External links

Vadim Repin Biography
Vadim Repin Homepage, unofficial website, very comprehensive
Discography, up to Octobre 2010
Biography of Vadim Repin, Productions Internationales Albert Sarfati
Biography of Vadim Repin, Columbia Artists Management Inc.

Interviews
Interview on Evene.fr , 30 October 2008
Interview of Vadim Repin by Mischa Damev from January 2011, published on YouTube

Reviews
Vadim Repin (violin) and Nikolai Lugansky (piano):
Crescendo, review by Noël Godts, translated from French into English, about their recital on 20 November 2002 in Brussels
Light-filled brilliance, review by Herbert Müller, translated from German into English, from Wienerzeitung, 27 November 2002
Vadim Repin (violin), Nikolai Lugansky (piano), Mischa Maisky (cello):
La Palme d'or pour les trois Russes , Critique du récital de Vadim Repin, Nikolaï Lugansky et Misha Maïsky au Théâtre des Champs-Élysées in Paris, 25 May 2005, written by Gérard Mannoni

References

Russian classical violinists
Male classical violinists
1971 births
Living people
Reina Sofía School of Music alumni
Musicians from Novosibirsk
Prize-winners of the Queen Elisabeth Competition
Deutsche Grammophon artists
21st-century classical violinists
21st-century Russian male musicians
Erato Records artists